Bruce Saville may refer to:

 Bruce Saville (sculptor) (1893–1938), American sculptor 
 Bruce Saville (businessman), Canadian businessman and philanthropist